The Birka female Viking warrior was a woman buried with the accoutrements of an elite professional Viking warrior in a 10th century chamber-grave in Birka, Sweden. Although the remains were thought to be of a male warrior since the grave's excavation in 1878, both osteological analysis and a 2017 DNA study proved that the remains were of a female.

During the 130 years between the first publication about this burial and the publication that the remains were female, there were over 50 papers published which accepted as fact that the individual was a high status warrior; a leader of men. It was only after the proof the individual was female that any papers were published which called into question this interpretation.

Archaeological records

Initial excavation 
Archaeologist and ethnographer Hjalmar Stolpe (1841–1905) excavated a burial chamber in the 1870s, as part of his archaeological research at the Viking Age site Birka, on the island Björkö (literally: "Birch Island") in present-day Sweden. In 1889 he documented the grave as Bj 581. It has been considered "one of the most iconic graves from the Viking Age." The grave was marked by a large stone boulder and was found on an elevated terrace where it was in direct contact with the garrison. The grave chamber was made out of wood and it was 3.45 m long and 1.75 m wide. The body was found collapsed from a sitting position, wearing garments of silk, with silver thread decorations. The goods found in the grave included "a sword, an axe, a spear, armour-piercing arrows, a battle knife, two shields, and two horses, one mare and one stallion". For the next 128 years, the skeleton was assumed to be that of a "battle hardened man". The warrior has been compared to "a figure from Richard Wagner's Ride of the Valkyries".

Reanalysis of skeletal remains 
Studies in the 1970s had questioned the assumption the skeleton was male. A 2014 osteological analysis of the skeleton's pelvic bones and mandible by Stockholm University bioarchaeologist Anna Kjellström provided evidence that the bones were those of a female. 

A study led by Charlotte Hedenstierna-Jonson, published in September 2017, noted Kjellström's "osteological analysis triggered questions concerning sex, gender and identity among Viking warriors". Hedenstierna-Jonson's team extracted DNA from samples taken from a tooth and an arm bone of the person buried in Bj 581. The skeleton had two different X-chromosomes, but no Y-chromosomes, conclusively proving that the bones were that of a female.

The same study also analyzed Strontium isotopes on the skeleton to determine the geographic profile of the individual. This determined that she has similar markers with present-day people living in areas that were under the sphere of influence of the Vikings. This has brought forward the question of whether or not the individual was originally from Birka, or if she had settled there afterwards.

Controversially, the conclusion of the study was that "the individual in grave Bj 581 is the first confirmed female high-ranking Viking warrior". The authors responded to the criticism of their original study in a second article published in Antiquity, which provided additional information about their methodology and reaffirmed their conclusion.

Analysis of grave artifacts 
Analysis of the contents of the grave showed that it contained a game set with a board and pieces, noted as typically symbolizing strategic thinking, which has led to speculation "that she was an officer who could lead troops into battle". The Guardian reported, "Gaming pieces – perhaps from hnefatafl, a sort of precursor to chess – suggest the female warrior from grave Bj 581 was a battle strategist." According to Kjellström, "Only a few warriors are buried with gaming pieces, and they signal strategic thinking." This may also indicate that she was  a member of the military caste. The Washington Post reported, "The warrior was, in fact, female. And not just any female, but a Viking warrior woman, a shield-maiden, like the ancient Brienne of Tarth from Game of Thrones." Archaeologist David Zori noted, "numerous Viking sagas, such as the 13th century Saga of the Volsungs, tell of 'shield-maidens' fighting alongside male warriors". An analysis of the weapons indicates the weapons had been used by a trained warrior and were not ceremonial.

Interpretations 
Scholars have not agreed on the interpretation of complex Viking burial findings. Viking studies professor Judith Jesch rebutted the study's conclusion that the skeleton originally interred in Bj 581 was that of a female warrior, arguing that since the grave was excavated in 1889, bones from other graves may have been mixed together; that the inference that she was a warrior because of game pieces buried in the grave was premature speculation; and that the researchers had not considered other reasons for a female body in a warrior's tomb. Some other archaeologists were skeptical, citing the possibility that the bones had been mis-labeled in the last century, or perhaps jumbled with bones from other nearby graves. Archeologist Charlotte Hedenstestierna-Jonson stated that Hjalmar Stolpe was known for his meticulous note taking and careful documentation. Each bone found in the grave had been labelled "Bj 5811" with India ink at the time of excavation.

Authors of the Hedenstierna-Jonson paper stated that "Viking scholars have been reluctant to acknowledge the agency of women with weapons", and that "at Birka, grave Bj 581 was brought forward as an example of an elaborate high-status male warrior grave." Additionally, they cited Marianne Moen's 2011 study that concluded that the "image of the male warrior in a patriarchal society was reinforced by research traditions and contemporary preconceptions". Other scholars have noted that cultural bias can result in incorrect interpretations of burial sites.

The Hedenstierna-Jonson team considered questions about the sex identification of the remains within the context of the martial objects buried with the bones, asserting that "the distribution of the grave goods within the grave, their spatial relation to the female individual and the total lack of any typically female attributed grave artefacts" disputed possibilities that the other artefacts belonged to the family of the deceased, or to a male "now missing" from the grave. In answer to the question, "Do weapons necessarily determine a warrior?", the authors stress that interpreting the relevance of the artefacts buried with the body "... should be made in a similar manner regardless of the biological sex of the interred individual". 

After noting the androcentrism in archaeology and commenting on the questions some have interpreting the evidence for a female warrior, one observer wrote,

The Hedenstierna-Jonson study concludes with the comment, "the combination of ancient genomics, isotope analyses and archaeology can contribute to the rewriting of our understanding of social organization concerning gender, mobility and occupation patterns in past societies." Swedish historian Dick Harrison of Lunds University noted, "What has happened in the past 40 years through archaeological research, partly fueled by feminist research, is that women have been found to be priestesses and leaders, too ... This has forced us to rewrite history."

Female warriors in other Viking Age sources 

The image of warrior women was not foreign to the Vikings. There are several examples of female depictions where they are seen wielding weapons.

Mythology 
 Norse mythology depicts a group of supernatural women warriors called the Valkyries mentioned in the Poetic Edda, who act as guardians in Valhalla and allot death on the battlefield. Although shown carrying the dying from the midst of battle, they are rarely depicted participating in combat, although they are described as carrying spears.

 Shield-maidens are female warriors that take on male characteristics and attitudes, like dress and the wielding of weapons. They do this either because there is no male member of the family left, or they are escaping marriage.

Iconography 
 The Oseberg tapestry depicts anthropomorphic figures in dress that resembles that of Viking Age women, holding spears and swords.

 A series of brooches found in Tissø, Denmark depict what are believed to be armed female figures on horseback.

 A three-dimensional figure found in Hårby, Denmark, depicts a Viking Age female figure holding a sword and shield. The public interpreted it as a depiction of a Valkyrie, but nowhere in Norse mythology are Valkyries described wielding swords (their weapon of choice being a spear). This raises questions of whether this figure could represent a human female warrior.

Literature 
There are a few historical attestations that Viking Age women took part in warfare:

 Saxo Grammaticus, in his History of the Danes, described warrior women dressed as men and wielding weapons.

 The Byzantine historian John Skylitzes records that women fought in battle when Sviatoslav I of Kiev attacked the Byzantines in Bulgaria in 971. When the Varangians (not to be confused with the Byzantine Varangian Guard) had suffered a devastating defeat in the Siege of Dorostolon, the victors were stunned to discover armed women among the fallen warriors.

Saga literature has many examples of this as well:
 Freydís, in the Greenland saga, is manipulative and greedy. After cheating the people she was traveling with, Freydís proceeds to murder five women with an axe.

 The Laxdæla saga tells the story of Auðr, whose husband leaves her for another woman because she is always wearing men’s breeches. She decides to take her revenge and, dressed like a man, stabs him with a sword. The Laxdœla saga has the broadest range of female characters out of all the sagas, and probably had an intended female audience. It is interpreted as presenting an alternative to the disenchanted lives that women were living given their limited role in society.

 Hervör, in the Hervarar saga ok Heiðreks, is Angantyr’s only child. From early on she shows more aptitude for weapons than traditional female tasks. She wields the family sword against her father’s wishes and goes on many masculine adventures. It isn't until she decides to settle down and have children that the male line of the family is restored, allowing her to put down the mantle of son that Angantyr never had.

See also 
 Baugrygr, Viking heiresses, who were allowed to take over the role of head of the family and tasks normally performed by men. 
 Warrior
 Women in post-classical warfare
 Women warriors in literature and culture

References

External links 
 Secrets of The Vikings Vikings (TV Show) Special (video, 21:46 minutes–section on female Viking warrior begins at 6:43)
 PBS Secrets of the Dead: Viking Warrior Queen

10th-century deaths
10th-century Swedish people
10th-century Swedish women
10th-century Vikings
1889 archaeological discoveries
Archaeology of Sweden
Deaths in Sweden
Germanic women warriors
Human remains (archaeological)

Viking warriors
Women in medieval European warfare